The 11th World Championships in Athletics, under the auspices of the International Association of Athletics Federations (IAAF), were held at Nagai Stadium in Osaka, Japan from 24 August to 2 September 2007. 200 of the IAAF's 212 member federations entered a total of 1,978 athletes, the greatest number of competitors at any World Championships to date. Sarah Brightman, the world's best-selling soprano, performed her single Running at the opening ceremony.

Bidding process
Having bid unsuccessfully to host the 2008 Summer Olympics, Osaka was one of three cities to express an interest in hosting the 2007 World Championships alongside Budapest, Hungary and Berlin, Germany. By the IAAF's October 1, 2002 deadline, Budapest and Berlin had both withdrawn their bids, and Osaka was announced as the host city on November 15, 2002 as the sole remaining candidate. Berlin later bid successfully for the 2009 World Championships.

Major themes

Doping concerns
The IAAF stepped up its "war on doping" at the Osaka games, and for the first time, the number of drug tests exceeded 1,000. The IAAF lobbied the World Anti-Doping Agency to adopt stiffer penalties for first-time doping offences in WADA's code of practice. Before the Championships, former Olympic champion Ed Moses had voiced concerns about the extent of doping in the sport, and had even predicted that a medallist at the event would be found to have taken a banned substance. Despite these fears, the IAAF announced that only one of the samples taken over the course of the Championships was "suspicious" and required more examination. The governing body refused to elaborate further until more was known, but the French hurdler Naman Keïta admitted to having failed a drug test. The IAAF later confirmed that Keïta had tested positive for testosterone in an out-of-competition test at a training camp, and labelled the World Championships 'drug-free'.

Weather conditions
The Championships were held during an unseasonably hot summer in Japan, in contrast to the cool, wet and windy conditions of Helsinki two years earlier. Temperatures earlier in the month had reached 40 °C (104 °F), killing several people. Temperatures had eased somewhat by the start of the event, but with early-morning temperatures around 30 °C and humidity high, the IAAF maintained a colour-coded advisory scale warning of the risk of heat stroke. Casualties of the heat were not as high as initially feared, but dozens of athletes failed to finish the walks and marathons and a few did require medical treatment. Some athletes in shorter events blamed poor performances on the difficult conditions.

Attendance
Concerns had been raised in the week running up to the Championships about the low level of ticket sales - only 46% of seats had been filled by August 20. The Nagai Stadium was less than half full for the opening ceremony, and there were around 15,000 empty seats on the night of the men's 100 m final. A number of reasons were cited for the poor attendance, including high ticket prices (especially since the streets were lined during the marathons), the hot weather and the disappointing performance of the Japanese team. IAAF vice-president Sebastian Coe also suggested that the length of the Championships may have to be shortened in future to sustain the public's interest.

Notable performances
Despite no world records being broken, the Championships saw a number of significant personal and team achievements. The United States dominated the overall standings ahead of Kenya and Russia, equalling its best ever medal haul (first achieved in 1991) with 26, fourteen of them golds. The U.S. also set another Championship first by triumphing in all four relay races. These accomplishments were highlighted by three individual performances: Tyson Gay and Allyson Felix collected three gold medals each (Gay in the 100 and 200 metres and the 4 × 100 m relay, Felix in the 200 m and the two women's relays), a feat previously achieved only by Marita Koch, Carl Lewis and Maurice Greene; while Kenyan-born Bernard Lagat became the first man to win both the 1500 and 5000 m titles at the same World Championships. Perhaps the most unlikely American medal came from 110 m hurdler David Payne, who as first alternate had not travelled to Osaka with the rest of the team. After Dominique Arnold withdrew from the event with an injury, Payne only arrived in Japan the night before the heats, and proceeded to move through the rounds before taking bronze with a personal best.

Amongst prominent European successes were Swede Carolina Klüft's third consecutive world heptathlon title with a European record score, the victory of 39-year-old German Franka Dietzsch in the discus, which made her the second-oldest world champion ever and Nelson Évora's win in the triple jump, beating world-leading Brazilian Jadel Gregorio and defending champion Walter Davis. Christine Ohuruogu of Great Britain and Northern Ireland claimed a surprise gold in the women's 400 metres, less than a month after the expiry of a year-long ban imposed for missing three drug tests, while high jumper Kyriakos Ioannou claimed the first ever medal for Cyprus in a World Championships. Russia's Tatyana Lebedeva just missed out on an unprecedented long jump/triple jump double, but still ended up with a gold and a silver medal.

African countries were typically well represented in the middle and long-distance events, with Kenyans claiming both the men's and women's marathon titles and Ethiopia winning three golds.

Chinese athlete Liu Xiang, the only sprinter of non-African origin to clock sub-13 second 110m hurdles, took the gold medal at this event with a time of 12.95 seconds.

World Record Holders for the 20 km Walk, Jefferson Pérez, and 50 km Walk, Nathan Deakes, both won their respective events, confirming their dominance of the event. In Perez's case, this was his third World Championship Gold Medal in a row.

Host nation Japan gained its only medal on the final day with a bronze for Reiko Tosa in the women's marathon.

Men's results

Track
2003 | 2005 | 2007 | 2009 | 2011

Note: * Indicates athletes who ran in preliminary rounds.

Field
2003 | 2005 | 2007 | 2009 | 2011

Women's results

Track
2003 | 2005 | 2007 | 2009 | 2011

Note: * Indicates athletes who ran in preliminary rounds.

Field
2003 | 2005 | 2007 | 2009 | 2011

Medal table

Broadcasting
The broadcasters of the 2007 IAAF World Championships were as follows:

Japan
Broadcaster - TBS (Host broadcaster) and MBS (Cooperator)
Caster - Yūji Oda and Miho Nakai
Fieldcaster - Beni Arashiro
Official song - All my treasures (Yūji Oda)

Worldwide
This list is non-exhaustive.

Arab World - Al Jazeera Sports
Australia - SBS TV
Belgium - Sporza
Bosnia and Herzegovina - BHTV1
Brazil - SporTV
Bulgaria - BNT
Canada - CBC
Caribbean - CMC
China - CCTV
Croatia - HRT2
Czech Republic - ČT2
Denmark - DR2
Estonia - ETV
Europe - Eurosport
Finland - YLE
France - France Televisions
Germany - ARD and ZDF
Greece - ET1
Israel - Channel 1
Italy - RAI
Latvia - LTV7
Lithuania - LTV
New Zealand - Sky Television
Norway - NRK
Philippines - NBN
Poland - TVP
Portugal - RTP2
Russia - Sport-RTR
Serbia - RTS2
Slovakia - Dvojka
South Korea - KBS
Spain - TVE2
Sweden - SVT1, 2, HD
Switzerland - SRG-SSR
Turkey - TRT
United Kingdom - BBC
United States - NBC, Versus and WCSN
Venezuela - Meridiano TV

References

External links

Results from IAAF.org
11th IAAF World Championships in Athletics Osaka Official Site

 
World Athletics Championships
World Championships in Athletics
A
World Championships
International athletics competitions hosted by Japan
August 2007 sports events in Asia
September 2007 sports events in Asia
21st century in Osaka